Flypaper theory may refer to:

 Flypaper theory (economics), a theory regarding tax burdens  
 Flypaper theory (strategy), a military theory regarding drawing enemies to a single area